During the 2005–06 German football season, Borussia Dortmund competed in the Bundesliga.

Season summary
Another mediocre season saw Dortmund repeat last season's seventh-place finish, albeit with nine fewer points.

First-team squad
Squad at end of season

Competitions

Bundesliga

League table

DFB-Pokal

First round

References

Notes

Borussia Dortmund seasons
Borussia Dortmund